Goodbye Elliott is an American rock band from the Hawaiian Islands. The band is composed of lead vocalist/guitarist Jonny Stimac, his brother vocalist/guitarist/ukulele Chris Stimac, vocalist/bassist Paul Gubser, vocalist/keys/ukulele Ryan Johnston, and vocalist/drummer Jordan Smallwood  Since the band's formation in 2005 they have released three studio albums.

Formation
Goodbye Elliott was formed in Kailua-Kona, Hawaii in early 2005. All of the members are born and raised on The Big Island of Hawaii. Singer/guitarist brothers Jonny Stimac and Chris Stimac grew up with bassist Paul Gubser in Kona. In high-school the three of them formed together the band "Not Mother?" and released one full-length album under that name. They later created "Goodbye Elliott" after adding high-school friends keyboardist Ryan Johnston and drummer Jordan Smallwood.

Albums and recording

In 2006, after two sold out mainland tours and after gathering a large hometown following on the Big Island, Goodbye Elliott traveled to the Netherlands to record the band's first full-length album. On New Year's Eve of 2007 they released the album Running to California. After extensive touring, Goodbye Elliott joined in the studio with producer Al Clay (The Pixies, Pink, Pirates of the Caribbean, Batman Begins). In summer of 2008 Goodbye Elliott released E.P. Simple Summer Love.

The band released their third album E.P. "Summer" in the Summer of 2010.  It features production from Al Clay, Danny Stimac, and Jonny.  A music video was shot for the single "Don't Call Me Baby".

Commercial and critical acclaim

Goodbye Elliott's 2007 album release "Running to California" appeared at 25 on the US Modern Rock Charts and independently sold more than 40,000 copies. Along with appearing Live on Sirius XM Radio's 'Andy Dick Show,' Goodbye Elliott and their album "Running to California" was featured across radio stations worldwide.

In July 2012 Goodbye Elliott's music was featured on the ABC Family show Jane by Design, their new music also appeared on MTV, the E! series Married to Jonas, and in 2013 they were featured on the debut episode of the Fox comedy The Goodwin Games.

Goodbye Elliott had two of their songs included in the 2015 Canadian romantic comedy film A Date with Miss Fortune. One of the songs, "Almost Had It All", was specifically written for the film by Daniel Stimac, brother of the band's singer/guitarists. Jonny Stimac directed and appeared in the music video for the song. In January 2017, the song was nominated for the Canadian Screen Award for Best Original Song.

Members
Jonny Stimac - Lead Vocals, Guitar
Chris Stimac - Guitar, Ukulele, Backing vocals
Paul Gubser - Bass, Backing vocals
Ryan Johnston - Keys, Ukulele, Backing vocals
Jordan Smallwood - Drums, Backing vocals

Discography

Albums
Goodnight to You and Not to Me - E.P. - 2005 I Wanna Say Mason Inc.
Running to California - 2006 Goodbye Elliott Records
Simple Summer Love - E.P. - 2008 Big Island Studios
Summer - E.P. - 2010 Big Island Studios
I'll Never Let You Go - (UNRELEASED) Big Island Studios

Singles
 "Divinci's Theme" (2005)
"Ticket to Love" (2006)
"Don't Call Me Baby" (2010)
 "Sunshine Girl" (2010)

References

External links

Rock music groups from Hawaii
Musical groups established in 2005
Reggae rock groups
American reggae musical groups